Andriy Pisniy (born 20 September 1980) is a Ukrainian footballer who plays for Uzbek League club Mash'al Mubarek.

Career
Pisniy began playing football with FC Dnipro Dnipropetrovsk's youth side, and would eventually play one Ukrainian Premier League match for the club in 1998. He also played in the Ukrainian Premier League for FC Volyn Lutsk during the 2002–03 season and FC Naftovyk-Ukrnafta Okhtyrka and FC Zakarpattia Uzhhorod during the 2007–08 season. Pisniy joined FC Ihroservice Simferopol in March 2009, but would leave for Mash'al in August 2009.

References

External links 

1980 births
Living people
Ukrainian footballers
FC Dnipro players
FC Volyn Lutsk players
FC Naftovyk-Ukrnafta Okhtyrka players
FC Hoverla Uzhhorod players
FC Desna Chernihiv players
FK Mash'al Mubarek players
Association football defenders